The Stone House is the last structure remaining from the former Tai Hom squatter village. The building is located at No. 4 Tai Koon Yuen, Tai Hom, in the Wong Tai Sin District of Kowloon, Hong Kong, China. In 2002, Hong Kong's Antiquities Advisory Board recognized Stone House as a Grade III historic building.

 Tai Hom

History
The Stone House was built in the 1940s. It was built of granite from the Diamond Hill Stone Quarry, and was a typical structure within the area. The construction of the Stone House was based on one of China's four great classical novels, Dream of the Red Chamber. In 1947, land was bought by Yang Shou-ren, who named it Tai Koon Yuen; several film studios were subsequently set up in the area. Several businessmen then set up two–storied stone houses, providing residence for artists and film makers. The Stone House was owned by Wu Jun-zhao, ex-manager of the former Shanghai Bank of Communications, who rented it to the actor Roy Chiao between the 1950s and 1960s. The house at 5 Tai Koon Yuen, now demolished, was once the accommodation of film director Li Han-hsiang.

Redevelopment 
On September 6, Oriental Daily, the best-selling Chinese-language daily in Hong Kong published a story explaining that the government proposed to downgrade the building to "nil grade" classification. The newspaper article suggested that the proposed new classification may be aimed at easing construction of the Sha Tin to Central Link. The "nil grade" classification was confirmed on August 31, 2010.

References

External links

 Antiquities Advisory Board. Historic Building Appraisal. Stone House, No. 4 Tai Koon Yuen, Diamond Hill, Pictures

Wong Tai Sin
Nil grade historic buildings in Hong Kong